Sefwi-Akontombra  is one of the constituencies represented in the Parliament of Ghana. It elects one Member of Parliament (MP) by the first past the post system of election. Sefwi-Akontombra is located in the Sefwi-Akontombra district  of the Western North Region of Ghana.

Boundaries
The seat is located within the Sefwi-Akontombra District of the Western North Region, formally part of Western Region of Ghana. It was formed prior to the 2004 December presidential and parliamentary elections by the division of the old Sefwi-Wiawso constituency into the new Sefwi-Akontombra and Sefwi-Wiawso constituencies.

Members of Parliament

Elections

See also
List of Ghana Parliament constituencies

References 

Parliamentary constituencies in the Western North Region